Malhada Sorda is a town and civil parish in the municipality of Almeida, Portugal. The population in 2011 was 334, in an area of 45.77 km2.

Population

Patrimony 
 Parish Church of Saint Michael of Malhada Sorda and Belfry
 Anta da Pedra de Anta
 Sepulturas escavadas na rocha
 Sanctuary of Our Lady of Ajuda and Convent of the Barefooted Augustinians
 Traditional pottery kiln
 Alminhas da Malhada Sorda (Shrines)
 Synagogue of Malhada Sorda, with Sun clock
 Chapels of Saint Sebastian, Saint Anthony and of the Holy Christ
 Museum Padre José Pinto
 Jewry

Festivities and Pilgrimages 
 Pilgrimage – Festivities in Honor of Our Lady of Ajuda (September 5 to September 9) - the largest Pilgrimage of the Diocese of Guarda, which attracts pilgrims to the Sanctuary all year round
 Festivities
 Saint Michael (last Monday of May)
 Saint Sebastian (Sunday after the January 20)
 Festivities of the Singles and of the Divine Holy Spirit (Pentecost)
 Festivities of the Lord (Corpus Christi)
 Ceremonies of the Holy Week

Fairs 
 Every third weekend of the month
 Annual fair - September 7

References

External links 
 Bird Observation in the region of Malhada Sorda - in Portuguese
 Festivities in Honor of Our Lady of Ajuda - in Portuguese

Freguesias of Almeida, Portugal
Towns in Portugal
Portugal–Spain border crossings